Thalassia hemprichii, called Pacific turtlegrass, is a widespread species of seagrass in the genus Thalassia, native to the shores of the Indian Ocean, the Red Sea, and the western Pacific Ocean. Its growth rate increases with CO2 enrichment, and it can tolerate lowered light conditions caused by algal blooms, allowing for it to respond positively to ocean acidification and other disturbances.

References

Hydrocharitaceae
Seagrass
Plants described in 1871